Maverick Scott McNealy (born November 7, 1995) is an American professional golfer and 2018 graduate of Stanford University with a degree in Management Science and Engineering. In late 2016 and early 2017, he was the number one ranked golfer in the World Amateur Golf Ranking.

McNealy qualified for the 2014 U.S. Open at Pinehurst at the age of 18. During the 2014−15 golf season, McNealy shot a 61 in the final round of the Pac-12 Conference Championship tournament, tying the 18-hole Stanford record held by Tiger Woods and Cameron Wilson. In 2015, he won the Haskins Award, which is presented annually to the best collegiate male golfer in the United States, becoming the third Stanford University golfer to win the award since 1971 (the other two being Woods and Patrick Rodgers).

Despite being America's most highly rated professional golf prospect in 2016, McNealy considered passing on professional golf for a career in business. In August 2017, McNealy confirmed that he would turn professional after the 2017 Walker Cup. His professional debut was at the Safeway Open.

His father, Scott McNealy, co-founded Sun Microsystems, which was acquired by Oracle Corporation for $7.4 billion in 2010.

Professional career
McNealy played on the Web.com Tour in 2018. He played in 18 tournaments, making the cut in 12. His best finish was a tie for third at the United Leasing & Finance Championship. McNealy earned a total of $84,261 and finished 65th on the money list for 2018. He did not earn a PGA Tour card for the 2018–19 season but he did earn full status on the Web.com Tour for the 2019 season.

McNealy earned his PGA Tour card for the 2019–20 season, via his finish on the 2019 Korn Ferry Tour.

Personal life
McNealy was in a relationship with LPGA professional golfer Danielle Kang, who like McNealy lives in Las Vegas. Their relationship ended in 2021.

Amateur wins
2014 OFCC Fighting Illini Invite, SW Invite
2015 The Prestige at PGA West, The Goodwin, Pac-12 Championships, NCAA Chapel Hill Regional, Northern California Amateur Match Play, OFCC Fighting Illini Invite, U.S. Collegiate Championship, Gifford Collegiate-CordeValle
2016 Western Intercollegiate, Nike Collegiate Invite

Source:

Results in major championships
Results not in chronological order in 2020.

CUT = missed the half-way cut
"T" = tied
NT = No tournament due to COVID-19 pandemic

Results in The Players Championship

CUT = missed the halfway cut
"T" indicates a tie for a place

Results in World Golf Championships

1Canceled due to the COVID-19 pandemic

NT = No tournament

U.S. national team appearances
Amateur
Arnold Palmer Cup: 2015 (winners), 2017 (winners)
Walker Cup: 2015, 2017 (winners)
Eisenhower Trophy: 2016

See also
2019 Korn Ferry Tour Finals graduates

References

External links

American male golfers
Stanford Cardinal men's golfers
PGA Tour golfers
Korn Ferry Tour graduates
Golfers from California
The Harker School alumni
People from Portola Valley, California
People from Stanford, California
1995 births
Living people